So Blue may refer to:

 "So Blue" (De Sylva, Brown and Henderson song), a 1927 song covered by numerous artists
 "So Blue" (Prince song), 1978
 "So Blue" (Chisato Moritaka song), 1996
 "So Blue" (Arif Mardin song), 2010
 "So Blue" (Akon song), 2013
 "So Blue" (Fantasia song), 2016
 "So Blue", a 1955 song by The Stanley Brothers
 "So Blue", a Stan Rogers song from the 1978 album: Turnaround

See also
 So Blu, a 2001 album by Blu Cantrell